Bryan Steven Bradford, better known by the stage name Rock M. Sakura, is an American drag performer most known for competing on the twelfth season of RuPaul's Drag Race.

Early life and education
Bradford is Filipino and Vietnamese. They were born and raised in San Jose, California, and attended Adrian C. Wilcox High School in Santa Clara. They studied animation and illustration at De Anza College.

Career

In 2020, Rock M. Sakura competed on the twelfth season of RuPaul's Drag Race and participated in the Halloween variety special Bring Back My Ghouls. Their mockumentary series Rock M. Sakura Sexy Superhero Sickening Spectacular premiered in 2021.

In 2022, she was nominated in the 2022 WOWIE Awards in the category Best YouTube Channel (The Like, Comment and Subscribe Award).

Personal life
They live in San Francisco, and enjoy anime and gaming. In 2021, following a series of attacks on Asian American sex workers, they acknowledged their own history of sex work.

Filmography

Film
 The Bitch Who Stole Christmas (2021)

Television
 RuPaul's Drag Race (season 12, 2020)
 Bring Back My Ghouls (2020)
 Rock M. Sakura Sexy Superhero Sickening Spectacular (2021)

References

External links

 
 Rock M. Sakura at IMDb

1990 births
Living people
Asian-American drag queens
American people of Filipino descent
American people of Vietnamese descent
De Anza College alumni
LGBT people from California
People from San Francisco
People from San Jose, California
Rock M. Sakura